The Nokia Lumia 625 is a Windows Phone with a 4.7-inch IPS LCD WVGA (480x800) screen and 4G support. It was presented on July 23, 2013. It can be loaded up with the latest software update for Windows Phone 8.1, as well as Nokia's firmware update 'Denim' (excluding some features). It borrows features from the Nokia Lumia 1520, the Lumia 1020 and the Lumia 925.

Release
It is set to cost €220 or £200 in Europe. $300–$350 CAD  It was released in China, Europe, Asia Pacific, India, Middle East, Africa and Latin America initially, starting September.

Specifications/features
It features:
 Support for up to 128 GB external memory via microSD card
 Choice of colors - black, white plus translucent shades of orange, green, yellow
 Signature Camera Apps - Smart Cam, Cinemagraph and Panorama
 FM Radio

It has one of the lowest pixel densities seen in recent smartphones, as it uses the standard Windows Phone 8 resolution (800×480) but using a large display. So the screen will not appear super-sharp.

The 512 MB RAM according to some reviewers prevents one from playing high-end games and sometimes mar the multi-tasking experience for power users.

See also 

Microsoft Lumia

References

External links

 Official website

Microsoft Lumia
Mobile phones introduced in 2013
Discontinued smartphones
Windows Phone devices
Nokia smartphones